Ernest II, Duke of Brunswick-Lüneburg (1564–1611), was the Prince of Lüneburg from 1592 to 1611.

Life
Ernest was born on 31 December 1564 as the second of fifteen children and the eldest son of William the Younger and his consort Dorothea of Denmark. After studying at Wittenberg, Leipzig and Straßburg he returned to Celle as a result of his father's worsening health. In 1592, after the death of his father, he took over the reins of power. Initially he was limited to a rule of 8 years by a treaty with his brother Christian and the nobles. However, following the sealing of subsequent agreement, he was able to exercise power until his death on 2 March 1611. His rule was dominated by attempts to improve the financial situation of both the principality as well as his family, because his father had left the state in serious debt. Also worth mentioning is the Celle Family Treaty concluded by him in 1610, which secured the indivisibility of the principality and which was confirmed by Emperor Matthias in 1612.

Ancestors

See also 
 List of the rulers of Lüneburg

Sources

External links

House of Welf

Princes of Lüneburg
1564 births
1611 deaths
Middle House of Lüneburg
New House of Lüneburg